Gernot Kellermayr (born April 5, 1966) is a retired decathlete from Austria. He competed at the 1992 Summer Olympics.

In 1993 he tested positive for a banned steroid Metandienone, together with his teammates Franz Ratzenberger, Thomas Renner, and Andreas Berger, and was subsequently banned from competition for two years.

Achievements

References

1966 births
Living people
Austrian decathletes
Austrian male athletes
Athletes (track and field) at the 1992 Summer Olympics
Olympic athletes of Austria
World Athletics Championships athletes for Austria
Doping cases in athletics
Austrian sportspeople in doping cases